Calmonia is an extinct genus of trilobites. It contains one species: C. curvioculata. Fossils of Calmonia have been found in the Emsian to Eifelian Ponta Grossa Formation and Chapada Group of Brazil, the Belén and Sica Sica Formations of Bolivia and the Cordobés Formation of Uruguay.

References 

Calmoniidae
Phacopida genera
Devonian trilobites of South America
Devonian Bolivia
Fossils of Bolivia
Devonian Brazil
Fossils of Brazil
Devonian Uruguay
Fossils of Uruguay
Paraná Basin
Fossil taxa described in 1913